George Whitfield Jack (November 1, 1875 – March 15, 1924) was a United States district judge of the United States District Court for the Western District of Louisiana.

Jack was nominated by President Woodrow Wilson on March 6, 1917, to a seat vacated by Alexander Boarman. He was confirmed by the United States Senate on March 16, 1917, and received commission the same day. Jack's service was terminated on March 15, 1924, due to death.

Education and career

Born on November 1, 1875, in Natchitoches, Louisiana, Jack received a Bachelor of Laws in 1898 from Tulane University Law School. He entered private practice in Shreveport, Louisiana from 1898 to 1910. He was the city attorney for Shreveport from 1910 to 1913. He was the United States Attorney for the Western District of Louisiana from 1913 to 1917.

Federal judicial service

Jack was nominated by President Woodrow Wilson on March 6, 1917, to a seat on the United States District Court for the Western District of Louisiana vacated by Judge Alexander Boarman. He was confirmed by the United States Senate on March 16, 1917, and received his commission the same day. His service terminated on March 15, 1924, due to his death in Shreveport.

References

Sources
 

1875 births
1924 deaths
United States Attorneys for the Western District of Louisiana
Judges of the United States District Court for the Western District of Louisiana
United States district court judges appointed by Woodrow Wilson
20th-century American judges
Tulane University Law School alumni
People from Natchitoches, Louisiana
Politicians from Shreveport, Louisiana